Peter Leo McKenzie is a New Zealand actor who is best known for his portrayal as Elendil in Peter Jackson's The Lord of the Rings: The Fellowship of the Ring. He also appeared in Jackson's King Kong.

His wife, Deirdre Tarrant, is a choreographer who founded Footnote Dance. Their son, Bret, is a member of the comedy duo Flight of the Conchords, and also appears as an unnamed Elf (popularly known as Figwit) in The Fellowship of the Ring, and The Return of the King.

He is also an owner and trainer of racehorses, including Sculptor who won the 2007 Saab Quality at Flemington and qualified to run in the 2007 Melbourne Cup.

Filmography

Films

Television

References

External links
 
 TheOneRing.net biography

Living people
New Zealand male film actors
Year of birth missing (living people)
Male actors from Wellington City
21st-century New Zealand male actors
New Zealand male television actors